Schleithal is a commune in the Bas-Rhin department in Grand Est in north-eastern France. Located in the northern Lower Rhine just steps from the French-German border. This boundary is defined by the Lauter which gives its name to the small town of Lauterbourg located at the mouth of the river Rhine. Schleithal is a linear settlement.

History
The first writings of Schleithal date from 1145, but some believe that the village dates from 631 (year of establishment of the abbey of Wissembourg). The village became French after the Treaty or otherwise known as Peace of Westphalia in 1648.

See also
 Communes of the Bas-Rhin department

References

Communes of Bas-Rhin
Bas-Rhin communes articles needing translation from French Wikipedia